Eubank Hall, also known as Haleysburg and Eubank Plantation, is a historic home located near Fort Mitchell, Lunenburg County, Virginia. It is an "L"-shaped dwelling, consisting of a -story frame, square, single-pen house built about 1790, with a later two-story frame addition, and a three-story, frame, single-pile addition added about 1846.  It has a hipped roof and features two Jacobean-style chimneys. Also on the property is the contributing foundation of a kitchen.

It was listed on the National Register of Historic Places in 2007.

References

Houses on the National Register of Historic Places in Virginia
Houses completed in 1790
Houses in Lunenburg County, Virginia
National Register of Historic Places in Lunenburg County, Virginia